Terry Derrell Taylor (born July 28, 1964) is an American former professional baseball pitcher. He had played for the Seattle Mariners of the Major League Baseball (MLB). He made his MLB debut on August 19, 1988 and appeared in his final MLB game on September 20, 1988.

References

1964 births
Living people
African-American baseball players
American expatriate baseball players in Canada
American expatriate baseball players in Mexico
Baseball players from Florida
Bellingham Mariners players
Cafeteros de Córdoba players
Calgary Cannons players
Chattanooga Lookouts players
Major League Baseball pitchers
Memphis Chicks players
Mexican League baseball pitchers
People from Crestview, Florida
Piratas de Campeche players
Salinas Spurs players
Seattle Mariners players
Texas A&M Aggies baseball players
Wausau Timbers players
21st-century African-American people
20th-century African-American sportspeople